N0 ("N" followed by number zero) may refer to:
 Neutron, abbreviated n0
 , the natural numbers including zero
 Norse Atlantic Airways, The IATA code N0